Acraga parana is a moth in the family Dalceridae. It was described by S.E. Miller in 1994. It is found in southern Brazil and Paraguay. The habitat consists of subtropical wet, subtropical moist and warm temperate moist forests.

The length of the forewings is 11.5–14 mm. Adults are orange, with the dorsal forewings slightly darker than the hindwings. Adults are on wing from April to June, in September and from November to February.

Etymology
The species name refers to the state of Paraná, the type locality.

References

Moths described in 1994
Dalceridae